Bettina Heim (born 2 July 1989) was a Swiss competitive figure skater who now leads leads the language design team for Microsoft's Q# programming language.

Figure skating career
She was the 2011 Swiss national champion, and competed at two World Junior Championships and two World Championships.

Programs

Competitive highlights

Quantum physics and Q#
Heim completed her master's degree in quantum physics at ETH Zurich, advised by Matthias Troyer.

References

External links

 

1989 births
Living people
Swiss female single skaters
People from Appenzell Ausserrhoden
Competitors at the 2011 Winter Universiade